Sheykh Alu (also Romanized as Sheykh ‘Alū; also known as Shaikh ‘Ali, Shaykh-Ali, Sheykhlar, and Sheykhlū) is a village in Howmeh Rural District, in the Central District of Khodabandeh County, Zanjan Province, Iran. At the 2006 census, its population was 771, in 160 families.

References 

Populated places in Khodabandeh County